It's Love Again is a 1936 British musical film directed by Victor Saville and starring Jessie Matthews, Robert Young and Sonnie Hale. In the film, a chorus girl masquerades as a big game hunter to try to boost her showbiz career.

The film was made at the Lime Grove Studios, with art direction by Alfred Junge.

Plot
Under pressure to come up with a story, gossip columnist Peter Carlton (Robert Young) invents the imaginary socialite and big game hunter "Mrs. Smythe-Smythe." This glamorous lady spends her time hunting tigers, jumping out of airplanes and driving men wild with her beauty. Carlton is somewhat taken aback when the real lady turns up in person, impersonated by aspiring actress Elaine Bradford (Jessie Matthews), in search of her big break.

Cast
 Jessie Matthews as Elaine Bradford/Mrs. Smythe-Smythe 
 Robert Young as Peter Carlton 
 Sonnie Hale as Freddie Rathbone 
 Ernest Milton as Raymond 
 Robb Wilton as Boys - Butler 
 Sara Allgood as Mrs. Hopkins 
 Anthony Holles as Headwaiter
 Cyril Wells as Gigolo 
 Warren Jenkins as Woolf 
 David Horne as Durland 
 Athene Seyler as Mrs. Durland 
 Glennis Lorimer as Montague's typist 
 Robert Hale as Colonel Edgerton 
 Cyril Raymond as Montague 
 Graham Moffatt as Callboy
 Olive Sloane as Francine Grenoble (uncredited)

Critical reception
In The New York Times, Frank Nugent wrote, "Gaumont-British has yet to do full justice to Miss Jessie Matthews, first lady of England's musical comedy screen. Her latest picture, "It's Love Again," which opened yesterday at the Roxy, imposes the entire burden of a cumbersome and unevenly paced comedy upon her shoulders and, although she rises to the task with her accustomed loveliness, gayety and talent, she is unable to convert the picture into anything more than what the gentlemen of the drama department would call 'a personal triumph'"; whereas Leonard Maltin noted a "Lighter-than-air musical-comedy vehicle for Matthews following her success with Saville on Evergreen," and found the film, "Funny, charming and imaginatively done, with several pleasant songs."

Writing for The Spectator in 1936, Graham Greene gave the film a good review, describing the direction as "with speed, efficiency, and a real sense of the absurd". Greene praised the acting of Matthews and claimed that the double-entendre-filled scene of the "Oriental party" with the colonel and gossip-writer to be "memorable indeed".

References

Bibliography
 Low, Rachael. Filmmaking in 1930s Britain. George Allen & Unwin, 1985.
 MacNab, Geoffrey. Searching for stars: stardom and screen acting in British cinema. Casell, 2000.
 Wood, Linda. British Films, 1927-1939. British Film Institute, 1986.

External links

1936 films
British musical films
1936 musical films
British black-and-white films
Films directed by Victor Saville
Films shot at Lime Grove Studios
Films with screenplays by Lesser Samuels
1930s English-language films
1930s British films